Viva is a 2007 American sex comedy film written and directed by Anna Biller and starring, in addition to Biller, Jared Sanford, Bridget Brno, Chad England, Marcus DeAnda, and John Klemantaski. The plot concerns a 1970s suburban housewife who is dragged through the worst excesses of the sexual revolution.

Plot
In 1972, Barbi is happily married to Rick in suburban Los Angeles. She is friends with Sheila and her husband Mark, an actor, who frequently flirts with Barbi. After she is sexually harassed by her boss, Barbi quits her job. Rick is unperturbed and convinces Barbi to become a homemaker. However, Barbi and Rick begin to fight as he frequently travels for business. After Rick decides to spend a month away from her on a business trip, Barbi decides their marriage is over. Sheila informs her that Mark has also left her, and the two decide to live the single life.

While wearing risqué outfits, Barbi and Sheila are picked up by a madam who offers to arrange sexual encounters and dates for them. Barbi decides to go by the alias Viva, after the name of an erotic magazine she enjoys reading.

As Viva, Barbi goes on several arranged dates and has sexual encounters with various men. She meets photographer Clyde, but refuses to sleep with him until she is ready. However, after performing at an orgy, Clyde drugs and consummates with Viva. Perturbed by the encounter, Viva consults Sheila who reveals she is returning to Mark after realizing she is pregnant and encourages Viva to also reunite with Rick.

Right before her reunion with Rick, Mark attacks and attempts to rape Barbi. She fends him off, but when Rick arrives, he smells Mark's cologne and runs off. He ends up with a broken leg and reunites with Barbi. Sheila and Mark have a baby, and the two couples remain friends.

Barbi receives a phone call from Arthur, a musical producer friend of Clyde's, who offers her a role in his upcoming musical. At an audition, Barbi and Sheila perform a song about the different facets of womanhood.

Cast
 Anna Biller as Barbi/Viva
 Jared Sanford as Mark Campbell
 Bridget Brno as Sheila Campbell
 Chad England as Rick
 Marcus DeAnda as Clyde
 John Klemantaski as Arthur
 Paolo Davanzo as Elmer
 Barry Morse as Sherman
 Cole Chipman as Reeves
 Robbin Ryan as Agnes

Production
Biller's concept for Viva originally started as a photo series inspired by old Playboy magazines, and the photos inspired her to create a story surrounding these characters. Another major inspiration was Luis Buñuel's film Belle de Jour (1967). Biller used the photos as a proof-of-concept, and was able to secure the full funding to make a feature film from a private investor. The film was made slowly as they had to repeatedly pause production to raise more money. They originally budgeted for $100,000, but the final cost of the film was $750,000. Principal photography lasted from 2005 to 2007. Biller chose to star in the film herself because she "wouldn't ask another actress to take off her clothes in the movie and do all these things with the power trip being 'I'm the director, you're the actress.'"

Release
Viva premiered at the 36th International Film Festival Rotterdam in 2007. It was also entered into the main competition at the 29th Moscow International Film Festival. The film had a limited theatrical release by Vagrant Films Releasing; it played at Cinema Village in New York as well as in New Orleans, Cleveland, and Los Angeles. Viva was released on DVD by Cult Epics and Anchor Bay Entertainment on Feb. 24, 2009.

Reception
Viva received mixed to positive reactions, and "illustrates cinema's unique ability to blend high and low culture." On Rotten Tomatoes, the film holds an approval rating of 62% based on 50 reviews, with an average rating of 5.50/10. The site's critics consensus reads, "Though it's lengthy and doesn't always walk the line between schlock and kitschy homage successfully, Viva lovely visuals and knowing humor are undeniable." On Metacritic, the film has a weighted average score of 58 out of 100, based on 14 critics, indicating "mixed or average reviews". Daniel Steinhart of Film Journal International wrote, "Full of campy performances and giggle-inducing period costumes, the film may be destined for cult status." Lauren Horwitch of Back Stage West wrote, "Biller once again proves herself to be a master multi-tasker with her new musical, Viva, which she wrote, directed, edited, designed the costumes, and stars in." It has been compared to the works of Russ Meyer and other sexploitation films of that era. Writing for the San Francisco Bay Guardian, Dennis Harvey listed Biller's performance in Viva as one of the year's "best performances most likely to be overlooked".

References

External links
 
 
 
 

2007 films
2007 comedy films
2007 independent films
2000s exploitation films
2000s feminist films
2000s musical comedy films
2000s parody films
2000s sex comedy films
American feminist comedy films
American independent films
American musical comedy films
American parody films
American sex comedy films
American sexploitation films
2000s English-language films
Films directed by Anna Biller
Films set in 1972
Films set in Los Angeles
2000s American films